Visakha Express is a 2008 Indian Telugu-language thriller film directed by Vara Mullapudi who co-wrote the film with Chandra Sekhar Yeleti and Harsha Vardhan. The film stars Allari Naresh, Rajiv Kanakala, Preeti Jhangiani, and Sindhu Tolani. The basic plot of the story is taken from Patricia Highsmith's novel Strangers on a Train (1950), which is about two strangers and an exchange of murders.

Plot
Two strangers, Dr. Raja (Rajiv Kanakala) and Ravi Varma (Allari Naresh) meet each other on a train, Visakha Express. Raja is annoyed with the problems caused by his drunkard father (Kota Srinivasa Rao) and in an unconscious situation shares his problems with Ravi Varma. A few days later, his father injures himself in an accident and is brought to the hospital, who dies of poisoning and the blame is put on the doctor. In fact, it is Ravi Varma who has designed the death on the train.

Ravi Varma marries Suchitra (Preeti), who is an ex-girlfriend of Raja. Ravi Varma is dissatisfied with the relationship between his wife and Raja and wanted to eliminate her. So Ravi Varma kills Raja's father and throws that case on Raja. He also blackmails Raja that if he kills his wife Suchitra, he will save him. The remaining story is about how Raja saves his ex-girlfriend and kills Ravi Varma.

Cast
 Allari Naresh as Ravi Varma
 Rajiv Kanakala as Dr. Raja
 Preeti Jhangiani as Suchitra
 Kota Srinivasa Rao as Mohan Rao, Raja's father
 Sindhu Tolani as Kokila
 Ali as Superintendent of Police
 Mumaith Khan as Geetha
 Vijaya Rangaraju as Inspector
 Dharmavarapu Subramanyam as Doctor
 Shankar Melkote as Dr. Melkote
 Narsing Yadav as Venu, wine shop owner
 Sivannarayana Naripeddi
 Raghu Karumanchi as Constable

Soundtrack

Reception 
Reviewing the film for Rediff.com, Radhika Rajamani wrote, "The film, which starts off as a whodunit finally boils down to a question of personal vendetta. In the end we are left wondering whether it is worth two hours of sitting through the film to get to the ending." Sify rated the film 3/5 and stated, "Story is good, but the screenplay by Chandrasekhar Yeleti and direction by Vara are disappointing. As the audiences come out of the theatre, they would certainly sympathize with the story. A unanimous feeling that it has not been handled with skill pervades their judgment."

References

External links
 
Film review

2008 films
2000s Telugu-language films
Films based on American novels
Films based on works by Patricia Highsmith
Indian thriller films
2008 thriller films
Indian crime thriller films
2008 crime thriller films